Herma Keil along with brothers Olaf, Klaus, Rudolf and cousin Freddie Keil formed The Keil Isles in the 1950s which proved to be a popular hit making band. The band at one stage was billed as Herma Keil & The Keil Isles. He was their lead vocalist for six years from 1960 until 1966. He along with sister Eliza left the band to pursue solo careers. He released records under his own name as a solo artist and he and sister Eliza appeared in the musical comedy film Don't Let It Get To You.

In later years Herma Keil moved to Australia and retired there.

Discography

Albums

Awards and nominations

Aotearoa Music Awards
The Aotearoa Music Awards (previously known as New Zealand Music Awards (NZMA)) are an annual awards night celebrating excellence in New Zealand music and have been presented annually since 1965.

! 
|-
| 1965 || "Teardrops" || Single of the Year||  || 
|-

Film and television appearances
Don't Let It Get To You

References

External links
AudioCulture profile

New Zealand guitarists
New Zealand male guitarists
New Zealand people of German descent
Samoan emigrants to New Zealand
Samoan people of German descent
New Zealand pop singers
Viking Records artists
Living people
Samoan emigrants to Australia
Year of birth missing (living people)